Ken Manheimer has been a prominent software developer of Zope and GNU Mailman who worked for NIST, CNRI, Digital Creations and Zope Corporation, and SpiderOak. He's been listed by Guido van Rossum together with Barry Warsaw as the probable inventor of the term Benevolent Dictator For Life (during his CNRI tenure).

Famous quotes
 "computers usefulness is ridiculously improbable.  you can quote me."

References

 
 

Year of birth missing (living people)
Living people